Chrysanthrax cypris is a species of bee fly in the family Bombyliidae.    This Bee Fly is an parasitoid of tiphiid wasps.

Distribution
United States.

References

Bombyliidae
Insects described in 1820
Taxa named by Johann Wilhelm Meigen
Diptera of North America